The Braille pattern dots-1 is a 6-dot or 8-dot braille cell with the top left dot raised. It is represented by the Unicode code point U+2801, and in Braille ASCII with "A".

Unified Braille

In unified international braille, the braille pattern dots-1 is used to represent open, unrounded vowel sound, like /æ/ or /ɑ/, such as the Latin letter A, Greek alpha, Cyrillic А, Hebrew/Arabic aleph, etc. It is also used to signify the number 1.

Table of unified braille values

Other braille

Plus dots 7 and 8

Related to Braille pattern dots-1 are Braille patterns 17, 18, and 178, which are used in 8-dot braille systems, such as Gardner-Salinas and Luxembourgish Braille.

Related 8-dot kantenji patterns

In the Japanese kantenji braille, the standard 8-dot Braille patterns 2, 12, 24, and 124 are the 8-dot braille patterns related to Braille pattern dots-1, since the two additional dots of kantenji patterns 01, 17, and 017 are placed above the base 6-dot cell, instead of below, as in standard 8-dot braille.

Kantenji using braille patterns 2, 12, 24, or 124

This listing includes kantenji using Braille pattern dots-1 for all 6349 kanji found in JIS C 6226-1978.

  - N/A - used only as a selector

Selector

  -  り/分 + selector 1  =  今
  -  や/疒 + り/分 + selector 1  =  岑
  -  よ/广 + り/分 + selector 1  =  矜
  -  ね/示 + り/分 + selector 1  =  衾
  -  し/巿 + り/分 + selector 1  =  黔
  -  宿 + selector 1  =  写
  -  宿 + 宿 + selector 1  =  冩
  -  う/宀/#3 + 宿 + selector 1  =  寫
  -  に/氵 + 宿 + selector 1  =  瀉
  -  selector 1 + ぬ/力  =  刃
  -  て/扌 + selector 1 + ぬ/力  =  扨
  -  な/亻 + selector 1 + ぬ/力  =  仞
  -  の/禾 + selector 1 + ぬ/力  =  籾
  -  と/戸 + selector 1 + ぬ/力  =  靭
  -  selector 1 + selector 1 + ぬ/力  =  刄
  -  仁/亻 + selector 1 + ぬ/力  =  仭
  -  か/金 + selector 1 + ぬ/力  =  釼
  -  つ/土 + selector 1  =  士
  -  つ/土 + selector 1 + め/目  =  填
  -  つ/土 + selector 1 + 亞  =  壼
  -  す/発 + selector 1  =  冬
  -  す/発 + selector 1 + selector 1  =  夊
  -  心 + す/発 + selector 1  =  柊
  -  や/疒 + す/発 + selector 1  =  疼
  -  く/艹 + す/発 + selector 1  =  苳
  -  む/車 + す/発 + selector 1  =  螽
  -  せ/食 + す/発 + selector 1  =  鮗
  -  と/戸 + す/発 + selector 1  =  鼕
  -  よ/广 + selector 1  =  原
  -  よ/广 + selector 1 + selector 1  =  厂
  -  る/忄 + よ/广 + selector 1  =  愿
  -  お/頁 + selector 1  =  君
  -  心 + お/頁 + selector 1  =  桾
  -  う/宀/#3 + お/頁 + selector 1  =  窘
  -  そ/馬 + お/頁 + selector 1  =  羣
  -  ね/示 + お/頁 + selector 1  =  裙
  -  氷/氵 + selector 1  =  冷
  -  る/忄 + selector 1  =  壱
  -  れ/口 + る/忄 + selector 1  =  噎
  -  る/忄 + る/忄 + selector 1  =  壹
  -  ほ/方 + る/忄 + selector 1  =  殪
  -  せ/食 + る/忄 + selector 1  =  饐
  -  ほ/方 + selector 1  =  夕
  -  さ/阝 + ほ/方 + selector 1  =  夘
  -  に/氵 + ほ/方 + selector 1  =  汐
  -  selector 1 + ほ/方 + ほ/方  =  夛
  -  と/戸 + selector 1  =  居
  -  な/亻 + と/戸 + selector 1  =  倨
  -  て/扌 + と/戸 + selector 1  =  据
  -  ね/示 + と/戸 + selector 1  =  裾
  -  み/耳 + と/戸 + selector 1  =  踞
  -  か/金 + と/戸 + selector 1  =  鋸
  -  や/疒 + selector 1  =  山
  -  や/疒 + selector 1 + ん/止  =  岻
  -  仁/亻 + や/疒 + selector 1  =  仙
  -  つ/土 + や/疒 + selector 1  =  圸
  -  き/木 + や/疒 + selector 1  =  杣
  -  に/氵 + や/疒 + selector 1  =  汕
  -  や/疒 + や/疒 + selector 1  =  疝
  -  も/門 + や/疒 + selector 1  =  閊
  -  か/金 + selector 1  =  川
  -  か/金 + か/金 + selector 1  =  釧
  -  こ/子 + selector 1  =  工
  -  て/扌 + こ/子 + selector 1  =  扛
  -  き/木 + こ/子 + selector 1  =  杢
  -  に/氵 + こ/子 + selector 1  =  汞
  -  ま/石 + こ/子 + selector 1  =  矼
  -  ん/止 + こ/子 + selector 1  =  缸
  -  ⺼ + こ/子 + selector 1  =  肛
  -  え/訁 + こ/子 + selector 1  =  訌
  -  ゐ/幺 + selector 1  =  幼
  -  て/扌 + ゐ/幺 + selector 1  =  拗
  -  う/宀/#3 + ゐ/幺 + selector 1  =  窈
  -  し/巿 + ゐ/幺 + selector 1  =  黝
  -  は/辶 + selector 1  =  延
  -  は/辶 + selector 1 + selector 1  =  廴
  -  に/氵 + は/辶 + selector 1  =  涎
  -  ち/竹 + は/辶 + selector 1  =  筵
  -  く/艹 + は/辶 + selector 1  =  莚
  -  む/車 + は/辶 + selector 1  =  蜒
  -  は/辶 + む/車 + selector 1  =  蜑
  -  ゆ/彳 + selector 1  =  弓
  -  selector 1 + ゆ/彳 + selector 1  =  弖
  -  に/氵 + ゆ/彳 + selector 1  =  泓
  -  う/宀/#3 + ゆ/彳 + selector 1  =  穹
  -  み/耳 + ゆ/彳 + selector 1  =  躬
  -  龸 + selector 1  =  愛
  -  日 + 龸 + selector 1  =  曖
  -  め/目 + 龸 + selector 1  =  瞹
  -  ち/竹 + 龸 + selector 1  =  靉
  -  囗 + selector 1  =  我
  -  囗 + selector 1 + せ/食  =  鵝
  -  な/亻 + 囗 + selector 1  =  俄
  -  れ/口 + 囗 + selector 1  =  哦
  -  ふ/女 + 囗 + selector 1  =  娥
  -  や/疒 + 囗 + selector 1  =  峨
  -  心 + 囗 + selector 1  =  莪
  -  selector 1 + 囗  =  伐
  -  心 + selector 1  =  桜
  -  心 + selector 1 + よ/广  =  楙
  -  ん/止 + selector 1  =  欠
  -  よ/广 + ん/止 + selector 1  =  厥
  -  け/犬 + ん/止 + selector 1  =  獗
  -  み/耳 + ん/止 + selector 1  =  蹶
  -  つ/土 + ん/止 + selector 1  =  坎
  -  そ/馬 + ん/止 + selector 1  =  歃
  -  氷/氵 + ん/止 + selector 1  =  歇
  -  む/車 + ん/止 + selector 1  =  蠍
  -  ち/竹 + ん/止 + selector 1  =  篏
  -  も/門 + ん/止 + selector 1  =  闕
  -  火 + selector 1  =  熱
  -  も/門 + selector 1  =  気
  -  も/門 + selector 1 + selector 1  =  气
  -  り/分 + も/門 + selector 1  =  氛
  -  も/門 + も/門 + selector 1  =  氣
  -  る/忄 + も/門 + selector 1  =  愾
  -  そ/馬 + selector 1  =  牛
  -  そ/馬 + selector 1 + ん/止  =  牴
  -  れ/口 + そ/馬 + selector 1  =  吽
  -  う/宀/#3 + そ/馬 + selector 1  =  牢
  -  そ/馬 + の/禾 + selector 1  =  犂
  -  へ/⺩ + selector 1  =  王
  -  も/門 + へ/⺩ + selector 1  =  匡
  -  ち/竹 + へ/⺩ + selector 1  =  筐
  -  て/扌 + へ/⺩ + selector 1  =  抂
  -  日 + へ/⺩ + selector 1  =  旺
  -  き/木 + へ/⺩ + selector 1  =  枉
  -  に/氵 + へ/⺩ + selector 1  =  汪
  -  へ/⺩ + 日 + selector 1  =  珀
  -  日 + selector 1  =  白
  -  し/巿 + 日 + selector 1  =  帛
  -  る/忄 + 日 + selector 1  =  怕
  -  き/木 + 日 + selector 1  =  槹
  -  け/犬 + 日 + selector 1  =  狛
  -  ひ/辶 + 日 + selector 1  =  皀
  -  宿 + 日 + selector 1  =  皃
  -  や/疒 + 日 + selector 1  =  皚
  -  の/禾 + 日 + selector 1  =  粕
  -  く/艹 + 日 + selector 1  =  葩
  -  ね/示 + 日 + selector 1  =  袙
  -  ま/石 + selector 1  =  立
  -  ま/石 + ま/石 + selector 1  =  竝
  -  て/扌 + ま/石 + selector 1  =  拉
  -  す/発 + ま/石 + selector 1  =  竪
  -  心 + ま/石 + selector 1  =  苙
  -  の/禾 + selector 1  =  米
  -  の/禾 + selector 1 + き/木  =  糂
  -  の/禾 + selector 1 + そ/馬  =  糟
  -  と/戸 + の/禾 + selector 1  =  屎
  -  す/発 + の/禾 + selector 1  =  粂
  -  め/目 + selector 1  =  自
  -  ふ/女 + selector 1  =  舟
  -  ふ/女 + selector 1 + そ/馬  =  艚
  -  し/巿 + selector 1  =  色
  -  む/車 + selector 1  =  虫
  -  れ/口 + む/車 + selector 1  =  嗤
  -  ね/示 + selector 1  =  衣
  -  ね/示 + selector 1 + ん/止  =  祇
  -  ね/示 + selector 1 + よ/广  =  袤
  -  た/⽥ + ね/示 + selector 1  =  畩
  -  宿 + ね/示 + selector 1  =  袞
  -  龸 + ね/示 + selector 1  =  褻
  -  selector 1 + ね/示  =  衷
  -  た/⽥ + selector 1  =  谷
  -  や/疒 + た/⽥ + selector 1  =  峪
  -  ま/石 + た/⽥ + selector 1  =  硲
  -  め/目 + た/⽥ + selector 1  =  谺
  -  ゐ/幺 + た/⽥ + selector 1  =  谿
  -  ひ/辶 + た/⽥ + selector 1  =  逧
  -  さ/阝 + た/⽥ + selector 1  =  郤
  -  み/耳 + selector 1  =  身
  -  み/耳 + selector 1 + ゐ/幺  =  躱
  -  さ/阝 + selector 1  =  陸
  -  ち/竹 + selector 1  =  雨
  -  心 + ち/竹 + selector 1  =  樗
  -  き/木 + ち/竹 + selector 1  =  櫺
  -  せ/食 + selector 1  =  鳥
  -  や/疒 + せ/食 + selector 1  =  嶋
  -  き/木 + せ/食 + selector 1  =  樢
  -  selector 4 + せ/食 + selector 1  =  鳫
  -  宿 + せ/食 + selector 1  =  鳬
  -  ひ/辶 + せ/食 + selector 1  =  鶫
  -  め/目 + せ/食 + selector 1  =  鷆
  -  よ/广 + せ/食 + selector 1  =  鷸
  -  龸 + せ/食 + selector 1  =  鷽
  -  selector 1 + お/頁  =  丸
  -  ち/竹 + selector 1 + お/頁  =  笂
  -  selector 1 + ゐ/幺  =  乃
  -  な/亻 + selector 1 + ゐ/幺  =  仍
  -  こ/子 + selector 1 + ゐ/幺  =  孕
  -  き/木 + selector 1 + ゐ/幺  =  朶
  -  selector 1 + か/金  =  于
  -  れ/口 + selector 1 + か/金  =  吁
  -  selector 1 + ま/石  =  亟
  -  selector 1 + 龸  =  亠
  -  selector 1 + 龸 + れ/口  =  亰
  -  selector 1 + 比 + 龸  =  卞
  -  selector 1 + 宿  =  元
  -  selector 1 + selector 1 + 宿  =  兀
  -  宿 + selector 1 + 宿  =  冦
  -  う/宀/#3 + selector 1 + 宿  =  寇
  -  む/車 + selector 1 + 宿  =  翫
  -  心 + selector 1 + 宿  =  芫
  -  さ/阝 + selector 1 + 宿  =  阮
  -  selector 1 + さ/阝  =  卩
  -  selector 1 + う/宀/#3  =  参
  -  selector 1 + selector 1 + う/宀/#3  =  參
  -  に/氵 + selector 1 + う/宀/#3  =  滲
  -  く/艹 + selector 1 + う/宀/#3  =  蔘
  -  そ/馬 + selector 1 + う/宀/#3  =  驂
  -  せ/食 + selector 1 + う/宀/#3  =  鯵
  -  う/宀/#3 + selector 1 + selector 1  =  宀
  -  selector 1 + う/宀/#3 + て/扌  =  舉
  -  selector 1 + ゑ/訁  =  叉
  -  て/扌 + selector 1 + ゑ/訁  =  扠
  -  か/金 + selector 1 + ゑ/訁  =  釵
  -  と/戸 + selector 1 + ゑ/訁  =  靫
  -  selector 1 + け/犬  =  天
  -  な/亻 + selector 1 + け/犬  =  俣
  -  日 + selector 1 + け/犬  =  昊
  -  selector 1 + な/亻  =  意
  -  れ/口 + selector 1 + な/亻  =  噫
  -  心 + selector 1 + な/亻  =  檍
  -  selector 1 + こ/子  =  孑
  -  selector 1 + の/禾  =  喬
  -  selector 1 + す/発  =  巨
  -  火 + selector 1 + す/発  =  炬
  -  の/禾 + selector 1 + す/発  =  秬
  -  く/艹 + selector 1 + す/発  =  苣
  -  か/金 + selector 1 + す/発  =  鉅
  -  selector 1 + ゆ/彳  =  憂
  -  て/扌 + selector 1 + ゆ/彳  =  擾
  -  selector 1 + を/貝  =  斥
  -  て/扌 + selector 1 + を/貝  =  拆
  -  に/氵 + selector 1 + を/貝  =  泝
  -  selector 1 + そ/馬  =  曹
  -  き/木 + selector 1 + そ/馬  =  槽
  -  selector 1 + に/氵  =  朮
  -  selector 1 + ん/止  =  氏
  -  し/巿 + selector 1 + ん/止  =  帋
  -  ま/石 + selector 1 + ん/止  =  砥
  -  ⺼ + selector 1 + ん/止  =  胝
  -  囗 + selector 1 + ん/止  =  觝
  -  え/訁 + selector 1 + ん/止  =  詆
  -  selector 1 + き/木  =  甚
  -  心 + selector 1 + き/木  =  椹
  -  に/氵 + selector 1 + き/木  =  湛
  -  ま/石 + selector 1 + き/木  =  碪
  -  か/金 + selector 1 + き/木  =  鍖
  -  selector 1 + め/目  =  真
  -  selector 1 + selector 1 + め/目  =  眞
  -  れ/口 + selector 1 + め/目  =  嗔
  -  心 + selector 1 + め/目  =  槙
  -  や/疒 + selector 1 + め/目  =  癲
  -  め/目 + selector 1 + め/目  =  瞋
  -  selector 1 + よ/广  =  矛
  -  え/訁 + selector 1 + よ/广  =  譎
  -  る/忄 + selector 1 + よ/广  =  懋
  -  selector 1 + ⺼  =  血
  -  に/氵 + selector 1 + ⺼  =  洫
  -  ぬ/力 + selector 1 + ⺼  =  衂
  -  そ/馬 + selector 1 + ⺼  =  衄
  -  selector 1 + ひ/辶  =  雍
  -  selector 1 + と/戸  =  髟
  -  selector 1 + お/頁 + す/発  =  夐
  -  selector 1 + の/禾 + き/木  =  乖
  -  selector 1 + ろ/十 + 囗  =  冉
  -  selector 1 + 宿 + ふ/女  =  冨
  -  selector 1 + き/木 + ぬ/力  =  剌
  -  selector 1 + selector 4 + ね/示  =  剱
  -  selector 1 + 比 + ぬ/力  =  匆
  -  selector 1 + 囗 + へ/⺩  =  囗
  -  つ/土 + た/⽥ + selector 1  =  壑
  -  selector 1 + う/宀/#3 + へ/⺩  =  寳
  -  か/金 + 宿 + selector 1  =  巛
  -  selector 1 + よ/广 + ろ/十  =  廰
  -  selector 1 + 囗 + い/糹/#2  =  弍
  -  selector 1 + ろ/十 + て/扌  =  愽
  -  selector 1 + る/忄 + み/耳  =  懴
  -  て/扌 + や/疒 + selector 1  =  攜
  -  selector 1 + り/分 + ゑ/訁  =  敍
  -  selector 1 + き/木 + 数  =  朿
  -  き/木 + 火 + selector 1  =  杰
  -  心 + 心 + selector 1  =  櫻
  -  selector 1 + 比 + は/辶  =  毋
  -  selector 1 + 氷/氵 + け/犬  =  濳
  -  や/疒 + ち/竹 + selector 1  =  癨
  -  す/発 + 宿 + selector 1  =  癶
  -  selector 1 + け/犬 + か/金  =  竒
  -  ん/止 + ん/止 + selector 1  =  缺
  -  き/木 + ま/石 + selector 1  =  蘖
  -  selector 1 + 比 + に/氵  =  襾

Compounds of 一

 -  数 + #1  =  一

  -  ふ/女 + 数 + selector 1  =  丕
  -  selector 1 + る/忄 + #1  =  弌

Compounds of 亜

 -  あ + selector 1  =  亜

  -  あ + selector 1 + selector 1  =  亞
  -  あ + selector 1 + 心  =  惡
  -  か/金 + あ/亞 + 心  =  鐚
  -  か/金 + あ/亜 + selector 1  =  錏
  -  心 + selector 1 + selector 1  =  椏
  -  つ/土 + 龸 + あ/亞  =  壺
  -  あ/亞 + つ/土  =  堊
  -  れ/口 + あ/亜  =  唖
  -  つ/土 + 宿 + あ/亜  =  壷
  -  あ/亜 + 心  =  悪

Notes

Braille patterns